This uniform polyhedron compound is a composition of the 2 enantiomers of the snub cube. As a holosnub, it is represented by Schläfli symbol βr{4,3} and Coxeter diagram .

The vertex arrangement of this compound is shared by a convex nonuniform truncated cuboctahedron, having rectangular faces, alongside irregular hexagons and octagons, each alternating with two edge lengths.

Together with its convex hull, it represents the snub cube-first projection of the nonuniform snub cubic antiprism.

Cartesian coordinates
Cartesian coordinates for the vertices are all the permutations of
(±1, ±ξ, ±1/ξ)

where ξ is the real solution to

which can be written

or approximately 0.543689. ξ is the reciprocal of the tribonacci constant.

Equally, the tribonacci constant, t, just like the snub cube, can compute the coordinates as:
(±1, ±t, ±)

Truncated cuboctahedron 
This compound can be seen as the union of the two chiral alternations of a truncated cuboctahedron:

See also
 Compound of two icosahedra

References 
.

Polyhedral compounds